Benno Gerrit Valentijn Kuipers (born March 6, 1974 in Ede, Gelderland) is a former breaststroke swimmer from the Netherlands. Kuipers competed for his native country in two consecutive Summer Olympics, starting in 1996 in Atlanta, Georgia.

After having missed qualification for the European LC Championships 2002 in Berlin, he retired from the international scene. He then became an assistant coach of Fedor Hes in Amsterdam. Kuipers won a total of eighteen Dutch titles during his career, which was plagued by injury.

During his swimming career, Kuipers became 18 times Dutch Champion. Currently Kuipers is known for his open water enthousiasm, he regularly trains in an Amsterdam lake called ‘De Nieuwe Meer’.

References

 Dutch Olympic Committee
 Profile in Zwemkroniek (in Dutch)

1974 births
Living people
Dutch male breaststroke swimmers
Dutch swimming coaches
Olympic swimmers of the Netherlands
Swimmers at the 1996 Summer Olympics
Swimmers at the 2000 Summer Olympics
People from Ede, Netherlands
Sportspeople from Gelderland
20th-century Dutch people